Diplomatic immunity is a form of legal immunity for diplomats working outside their home countries.

Diplomatic immunity or Diplomatic Immunity may also refer to:

 Diplomatic Immunity (novel), by Lois McMaster Bujold, 2002

Film and television
 Diplomatic Immunity (1991 American film), directed by Peter Maris
 Diplomatic Immunity (1991 Canadian film), directed by Sturla Gunnarsson
 Diplomatic Immunity (Canadian TV series), a news magazine series which ran from 1998 to 2006
 Diplomatic Immunity (New Zealand TV series), a 2009 TV comedy about a fictional consulate

Music
 Diplomatic Immunity (The Diplomats album), 2003
 Diplomatic Immunity (Client Liaison album), 2016
 "Diplomatic Immunity" (song), a 2018 song by Drake from the EP Scary Hours
 "Diplomatic Immunity", song by Charged GBH from City Babys Revenge